Greece competed at the 2022 World Aquatics Championships in Budapest, Hungary from 18 June to 3 July.

Medalists

Artistic swimming 

Greece entered 12 artistic swimmers.

Women

Diving

Greece entered 2 divers.

Men

Open water swimming

Greece entered 5 open water swimmers (3 male and 2 female )

Men

Mixed

Swimming

Greece entered 15 swimmers.
Men

Women

Mixed

Water polo

Summary

Men's tournament

Team roster

Group play

Quarterfinal

Semifinal

Third place game

Women's tournament

Team roster

Group play

Quarterfinals

5th–8tth place semifinal

Seventh place game

References

Nations at the 2022 World Aquatics Championships
2022
World Aquatics Championships